Take Two is an American crime comedy-drama television series. Created by Andrew W. Marlowe and Terri Edda Miller, the creator and executive producer of Castle respectively, it stars Rachel Bilson and Eddie Cibrian. It premiered on ABC in the United States on June 21, 2018. In November 2018, the series was canceled after one season.

Premise 
The series centers on Sam, fresh out of rehab and the former star of a hit cop series, and Eddie, a private investigator. They team up to solve crimes as Sam needs to conduct research for a potential comeback role. To get a P.I. movie lead, she has to shadow Eddie, an ex-LAPD detective-turned-private-eye. After solving a case, Sam decides to become Eddie's partner and learn more about being a P.I. after realizing that her acting skills make her a natural at the job.

Cast and characters

Main 
 Rachel Bilson as Sam Swift, a disgraced actress who famously played a detective in a TV series, Hot Suspect, with over 200 episodes before her career collapsed due to alcohol problems. After leaving rehab, she starts over by becoming a P.I. working alongside Eddie, at first doing so to gain firsthand experience for a potential movie role before deciding that being a private detective is more fulfilling.
 Eddie Cibrian as Eddie Valetik, a private investigator and former LAPD detective who now works as a consultant with the department. He is cynical about Sam, seeing her as a liability to his job, but ultimately makes her his partner when she demonstrates a willingness to learn the ropes of being a P.I.
 Xavier de Guzman as Roberto "Berto" Vasquez, Eddie's tech assistant.
 Aliyah O'Brien as Detective Christine "Chris" Rollins, an LAPD detective. Rollins and Eddie have an on-again/off-again relationship.
 Alice Lee as Monica, Sam's unpaid assistant who is working towards her PhD in Psychology.

Recurring 
 Jordan Gavaris as Mick English, a medical examiner.
 Heather Doerksen as Syd, Sam's agent who hooks her up with Eddie's detective agency. 
 Lamont Thompson as Zeus, Eddie's former partner from the LAPD who is currently a bar owner and runs a consulting firm that uses top-notch security systems.

Episodes

Production

Development 
The series, which was in development since late March 2016, was ordered straight-to-series by ABC on November 16, 2017, with German RTL Group's channel VOX and French France 2 instantly joining them. On November 21, 2018, ABC canceled the series after one season.

Casting 
On November 16, 2017, Rachel Bilson and Eddie Cibrian were cast as Sam and Eddie, the female and male leads, respectively. Xavier de Guzman joined the cast as Berto on February 15, 2018, and afterwards on March 13, 2018, Aliyah O'Brien and Alice Lee were cast as Detective Christine Rollins and Monica, respectively.

Filming 
Production of the series started shooting at Crossing Riverbend Studios in Burnaby, British Columbia, on February 26, 2018, and concluded on July 23, 2018.

Reception

Critical response
On the review aggregator website Rotten Tomatoes, the series has an approval rating of 67% based on 15 reviews, with an average rating of 5.96/10. The website's critical consensus reads, "While Take Two is more entertaining than expected – with a desirable chemistry between the stars – the writing is too shaky to break its cookie-cutter mold." Metacritic, which uses a weighted average, scores the series 53 out of 100 based on 10 reviews, indicating "mixed or average reviews".

Ratings

References

External links 
 
 

2010s American comedy-drama television series
2010s American crime drama television series
2010s American police comedy television series
2010s American police procedural television series
2018 American television series debuts
2018 American television series endings
American Broadcasting Company original programming
English-language television shows
Television series by ABC Studios
Television series by StudioCanal
Television series by Tandem Productions
Television series about television
Television shows filmed in Burnaby
Fictional portrayals of the Los Angeles Police Department
Television shows set in Los Angeles